Adelieae is a tribe of the subfamily Acalyphoideae, under the family Euphorbiaceae. It comprises 5 genera.

Genera
 Adelia L.
 Crotonogynopsis Pax
 Enriquebeltrania Rzed.
 Garciadelia Jestrow & Jiménez Rodr.
 Lasiocroton Griseb.
 Leucocroton Griseb.

See also 
 Taxonomy of the Euphorbiaceae

References

External links 

 
Euphorbiaceae tribes